Darius Sanders (born September 25, 1983) is a former American football defensive end for the San Francisco 49ers.

Career
In 2002, Sanders signed with the Oregon Ducks. After his time with the Ducks ended in 2006,  Sanders joined the San Francisco 49ers as a free agent.

References

1983 births
Living people
Players of American football from Los Angeles
American football defensive ends
Oregon Ducks football players
San Francisco 49ers players